Nada Como el Sol is an extended play by Sting, containing five songs from his second solo album Nothing Like the Sun sung in Spanish and Portuguese and published in 1988. It therefore contains four versions sung in Spanish of the following songs Little Wing by Jimi Hendrix titled here Mariposa Libre, We'll Be Together whose title becomes Si estamos juntos, They Dance Alone translates to Ellas danzan solas (Cueca solas) and finally Fragile retitled Fragilidad, this same song performed also in Portuguese becomes Frágil. The same musicians as on the original English versions can be found on this EP.

Reception

AllMusic wrote "This was a well-done project -- the translations are good and Sting manages the Spanish and  pronunciations well."

Track listing
 Mariposa Libre (Jimi Hendrix, Roberto Livi) – 4:54 - Little Wing 
 Frágil [Portuguese] (Liluca, Sting) – 3:50 - Fragile 
 Si Estamos Juntos (Livi, Sting) – 4:16 - We'll be Together 
 Ellas Danzan Solas (Cueca Solas) (Livi, Sting) – 7:17 - They Dance Alone 
 Fragilidad [Spanish] (Livi, Sting) – 3:52 - Fragile

References

1988 EPs
Spanish-language EPs
Sting (musician) EPs
Portuguese-language EPs
A&M Records EPs